The Essential John Denver is a compilation album of John Denver's songs. Composed of two discs, each containing 18 songs, the album was released in February 2007 as part of The Essential series by Sony BMG. A limited edition was eventually released.

The album peaked at No. 55 on the Billboard Top Country Albums chart.

Track listing

Notes

Charts

References

2007 compilation albums
John Denver compilation albums
Albums produced by Milt Okun
Albums produced by Larry Butler (producer)
Albums produced by Roger Nichols (recording engineer)